The 2013–14 Premier League of Bosnia and Herzegovina, also known as BH Telecom Premier League for sponsorship reasons, is the fourteenth season of the Premier League of Bosnia and Herzegovina, the highest football league of Bosnia and Herzegovina, since its original establishment in 2000 and twelfth as a unified country-wide league. The season began on 27 July 2013 and ended on 10 May 2014, with a winter break between 2 December 2013 and 1 March 2014. The official fixture schedule was released sometime in late June/early July 2013.

A total of 16 teams contested the league, including 14 sides from the 2012–13 season and one promoted club from each of the two second-level leagues, Vitez from 2012–13 First League of the Federation of Bosnia and Herzegovina and Mladost from 2012–13 First League of the Republika Srpska who replaced relegated Gradina and GOŠK.

Zrinjski were crowned national champions for the third time, while defending champions Željezničar ended up in fourth position.

Leotar and Rudar Prijedor were relegated at the end of the season, after finishing last and second from last, respectively.

Teams

A total of 16 teams contested the league, including 14 sides from the 2012–13 season and two promoted from each of the second-level league, 2012–13 First League of the Federation of Bosnia and Herzegovina and 2012–13 First League of the Republika Srpska.

Gradina was constantly on the last spot already since round 5 and got officially relegated 5 rounds before the season finished, ending their debut season rather unsuccessfully, earning only 9 points, which is the third lowest since the league renamed to Premier League of Bosnia and Herzegovina in the year 2000. The relegation of GOŠK was confirmed only after the last round finished, ending their two year run in the Premier League of Bosnia and Herzegovina.

The relegated teams were replaced by the champions of the two second–level leagues, Vitez from the First League of the Federation of Bosnia and Herzegovina and Mladost from the First League of the Republika Srpska. Both teams made their debut in the Premier League.

Stadiums and locations

1 Mladost will play their home games on 7,5 kilometer away Gradski stadion, Bijeljina because their Gradski stadion, Velika Obarska doesn't fulfill criteria for Premier League of Bosnia and Herzegovina.
2 Vitez will play their home games on 16,5 kilometer away Kamberović polje, Zenica due to their stadium not yet fulfilling criteria for Premier League of Bosnia and Herzegovina. It is planned that they will play on their Gradski stadion, Vitez at the begin of October.

Personnel and kits

Note: Flags indicate national team as has been defined under FIFA eligibility rules. Players may hold more than one non-FIFA nationality.

Managerial changes

League table

Positions by round

Results

Clubs season-progress

Season statistics

Transfers

For the list of transfers involving Premier League clubs during 2013–14 season, please see: List of Bosnia and Herzegovina football transfers summer 2013 and List of Bosnia and Herzegovina football transfers winter 2013–14.

Top goalscorers

* Italic highlights the former club, while bold the current one.

Hat-tricks

Clean sheets

Most clean sheets: 10
Sarajevo
Fewest clean sheets: 2
Vitez and Rudar Prijedor

See also
2013–14 Bosnia and Herzegovina Football Cup
Football Federation of Bosnia and Herzegovina

References

External links

facebook
FIFA
Soccerway
SportSport
worldfootball

2013-14
Bos
1